Events in the year 2023 in Luxembourg.

Incumbents 

 Monarch: Henri
 Prime Minister: Xavier Bettel

Events 

 Next Luxembourg general election.

Sports 

 7 August 2022 - 21 May 2023: 2022–23 Luxembourg National Division
 UEFA Euro 2024 qualifying Group J

References 

 
2020s in Luxembourg
Years of the 21st century in Luxembourg
Luxembourg
Luxembourg